CISM may be:

 Certified Information Security Manager, a security certification of the Information Systems Audit and Control Association
 Conseil International du Sport Militaire, or International Military Sports Council
 Critical incident stress management
 CISM-FM, a radio station in Montreal
  (CISM), which conducts biomedical research in priority health areas under a bilateral cooperation programme between the Governments of Mozambique and Spain